The School of Air Operations Control (SAOC) is the UK's training establishment for all military air traffic controllers (ATCs), sited at RAF Shawbury in Shropshire.

History
In 1950, the Central Navigation School joined the School of Air Traffic Control (from RAF Watchfield in south-west Oxfordshire), to form the Central Navigation and Control School (CN & CS). 

In 1963, the Central Navigation School moved to RAF Manby in East Lindsey, Lincolnshire, and the Shawbury site became the Central Air Traffic Control School in February 1963. In 1972 the Area Radar School at RAF Sopley in south-west Hampshire moved to Shawbury, being known as the Area Radar Training School. 

In July 1989, the school embarked on mainly training via computers.

Women
In 1963, the first three women to become air traffic controllers qualified at the school: Flying Officer G. Lord, Flight Officer S. Grieve and Pilot Officer A.P. Scougal.

Structure
The SAOC also houses the  Flight Operations Training School for Flight Operations Officers. Much of the training is done on computers, with the Computer Systems Squadron (CSS).

See also
 College of Air Traffic Control, Hampshire, previously in Dorset
 Defence Helicopter Flying School, also at Shawbury
 UK Military Flying Training System
 United Kingdom Low Flying System (UKLFS)

References

External links
 CATCS
 RAF Recruitment

1963 establishments in the United Kingdom
Air traffic control in the United Kingdom
Air traffic controller schools
Aviation schools in the United Kingdom
Education in Shropshire
Educational institutions established in 1963
Military training establishments of the United Kingdom
Military units and formations in Shropshire
Organisations based in Shropshire
Training establishments of the Royal Air Force